Snee Oosh (also spelled Snee-Oosh or Snee-oosh) is a populated place on Fidalgo Island in the U.S. state of Washington, on the Swinomish Indian Reservation. Population was reported as 302 in 1999.

The names all derive from a Swinomish village. In 2014, dozens of skinned animals washed ashore Snee Oosh beach. The carcasses were determined to be skinned minks being used as crab bait that were improperly disposed of.

Kukutali Preserve

The Kukutali Preserve, an extension of Deception Pass State Park jointly administered by the Swinomish and Washington State Parks in a unique arrangement, is adjacent to Snee Oosh, and occupies the entirety of Flagstaff Island and Kiket Island. It is the first state–tribal co-managed park in the United States. Kiket Island was once the planned site of a nuclear power plant.

References

Sources

Populated places in Skagit County, Washington